Adolph I, Count of Nassau-Wiesbaden-Idstein (1307 – 17 January 1370) was a son of Count Gerlach I and Agnes of Hesse.  In 1344, his father abdicated in favor of his sons.  They ruled jointly until 1355, then divided their inheritance:
 Adolph I inherited Nassau-Wiesbaden-Idstein (this line died out in the male line in 1605)
 John I inherited Nassau-Weilburg (this line died out in the male line in 1912)
 Rupert inherited Nassau-Sonnenberg (he died childless in 1390)

Marriage and issue 
In 1322 Adolph married Margaret, the daughter of Frederick IV, Burgrave of Nuremberg.  They had the following children:
 Gerlach II (1333–1386), inherited Nassau-Wiesbaden
 Frederick (d. 1376) was minister in Mainz
 Agnes (d. 1376), married Werner IV, Count of Wittgenstein
 John
 Margaret was abbess of Klarenthal Monastery
 Elisabeth (d. 1389), married in 1361 to Diether VIII, Count of Katzenelnbogen
 Adolph I of Nassau (1353–1390), Archbishop of Mainz from 1379
 John I (1353–1420)
 Anna was abbess of Klarenthal Monastery
 Walram IV (1354–1393), inherited Nassau-Idstein
 Catherine (d. 1403), married in 1373 to Reinhard IV, Count of Westerburg
 Frederick
 Walram II
 Joanna

Ancestry

Counts of Nassau
1307 births
1370 deaths
14th-century German nobility